The 2014–15 season of the RBK Kazakhstani Futsal Championship is the 17th season of top-tier futsal in Kazakhstan.

2014–15 season teams

Preliminary round table

Final round

Championship round

League table

Relegation round

League table

Final table

Top scorers
Final round only

See also
2014 Kazakhstan Futsal Cup

References

Kazakhstani Futsal Championship
Kazakhstan
2014 in Kazakhstani football
2015 in Kazakhstani football